The Company We Keep is an album by the Del McCoury Band, released through McCoury Music on July 12, 2005. In 2006, the album won the band the Grammy Award for Best Bluegrass Album.

Track listing 
 "Nothin' Special" (Walton) – 3:12
 "Never Grow Up Boy" (Allen, McCoury) – 3:21
 "If Here Is Where You Are" (McCoury, Schlitz) – 2:41
 "She Can't Burn Me Now" (New, Silbar) – 3:55
 "Mountain Song" (Keel) – 3:43
 "Untamed" (Meyer) – 3:17
 "Seventh Heaven" (McCoury) – 4:06
 "Fathers and Sons" (Nicholson) – 3:22
 "When It Stops Hurtin'" (Walton) – 3:26
 "Keep Her While She's There" (Allen, McCoury) – 2:45
 "When Fall's Coming Down" (Presley, Presley) – 3:27
 "I Never Knew Life" (Mumpower-Johnson, Salley) – 3:58
 "Eyes That Won't Meet Mine" (Simos) – 3:22
 "Blown Away and Gone" (Simos, Weisberger) – 3:53

Personnel 
 Mike Bub – Bass, Vocals, Baritone (Vocal)
 Neal Cappellino – Engineer, Mixing
 Chris Harris – Art Direction
 Del McCoury – Guitar, Vocals, Producer, Baritone (Vocal), Tenor (Vocal)
 Rob McCoury – Banjo, Guitar, Vocals, Baritone (Vocal)
 Ronnie McCoury – Mandolin, Vocals, Producer, Tenor (Vocal)
 Señor McGuire – Photography
 Stan Strickland – Art Direction
 Hank Williams – Mastering

Chart performance

References 

2005 albums
Del McCoury Band albums
Grammy Award for Best Bluegrass Album